The 1973 Virginia Slims of Boston, also known as the Virginia Slims Indoors,  was a women's tennis tournament played on indoor carpet courts in Boston, Massachusetts in the United States that was part of the 1973 Virginia Slims World Championship Series. The tournament was held from April 11 through April 15, 1973. Margaret Court won the singles title after a 59-minute final against Billie Jean King and earned $6,000 first-prize money.

Finals

Singles
 Margaret Court defeated  Billie Jean King 6–2, 6–4

Doubles
 Rosie Casals /  Billie Jean King defeated  Françoise Dürr /  Betty Stöve 6–4, 6–2

References

Virginia Slims of Boston
Virginia Slims of Boston
Virginia
Virginia